Jens Kiefer (born 19 November 1974) is a German football coach of Hallescher FC.

References

External links

1974 births
Living people
People from Sankt Ingbert
German footballers
SV Elversberg players
FK Pirmasens players
Association football midfielders
German football managers
FC 08 Homburg managers
SV Elversberg managers
SV Eintracht Trier 05 managers
Hallescher FC managers
3. Liga managers
Footballers from Saarland